Yuxarı Bucaq (also, Yuxarı Buçaq, Budzhak and Yukhary-Budzhak) is a village in the Yevlakh Rayon of Azerbaijan. The village forms part of the municipality of Aşağı Bucaq.

References 

Populated places in Yevlakh District